José Antonio Hipólito Espino Mora (13 August 1910 – 24 November 1993), better known as Clavillazo (Great Little Nail) was a Mexican comedic actor who was mostly popular during the 1940s to the 1960s.

History 
His catchphrases were ""¡Pura vida!", "¡Ahí nomás!", en tono de alegría o "¡Nunca me hagan eso!", "¡Méndigo!"". He appeared in more than thirty films from 1951 to 1988.

Selected filmography

References

External links 

1910 births
1993 deaths
Mexican male film actors
Male actors from Puebla
Mexican male comedians
20th-century comedians